Glutamate receptor delta-1 subunit also known as GluD1 or GluRδ1 is a transmembrane protein (1009 aa) encoded by the GRID1 gene. A C-terminal GluD1 splicing isoform (896 aa) has been described based on mRNA analysis.

Function 

This gene encodes a subunit of glutamate receptor ligand-gated ion channel. Most of these channels mediate fast excitatory synaptic transmission in the central nervous system. GluD1 is expressed in the central nervous system and is important in synaptic plasticity.

Clinical significance 

Several genetic epidemiology studies have shown a strong association between several variants of the GRID1 gene and increased risk of developing schizophrenia.

See also 
 GRID2

References

Further reading 

 
 
 
 

Ionotropic glutamate receptors